John Richard Boh (born May 18, 1964) is a Canadian former professional ice hockey centre. He played eight games in the National Hockey League (NHL) with the Minnesota North Stars during the 1987–88 season, scoring two goals and one assist. The rest of his career, which lasted from 1987 to 1993, was mainly spent in Europe.

Career statistics

Regular season and playoffs

Awards and honors

References

External links
 

1964 births
Living people
Canadian ice hockey centres
Colorado College Tigers men's ice hockey players
Geleen Smoke Eaters players
HC Fiemme Cavalese players
Ice hockey people from British Columbia
Kalamazoo Wings (1974–2000) players
Minnesota North Stars draft picks
Minnesota North Stars players
National Hockey League supplemental draft picks
Penticton Knights players
Sportspeople from Kamloops